Frederick Bevis Woodward (born 23 June 1995) is a British diver. He competed for England in the men's 3 metre springboard event at the 2014 Commonwealth Games where he won a bronze medal with his diving partner, Nicholas Robinson-Baker. He took part in the Rio 2016 Summer Olympics 3m springboard but narrowly missed qualifying for the semi-finals.

Woodward is the current British 3m synchro (with James Heatly) and 1m individual champion, winning both events at the 2018 British Diving Championships.

Woodward retired in 2018, stating that a career in competitive diving was not sustainable in his current position. He subsequently spent 6 months on a cruise-liner, acting as an on-board aquatics performer, before returning to the UK. He has since continued in his work as an on-board aquatics performer for a second cruise season.

References

External links
 
 
 
 
 
 
 

1995 births
Living people
English male divers
Commonwealth Games medallists in diving
Commonwealth Games bronze medallists for England
Divers at the 2014 Commonwealth Games
Olympic divers of Great Britain
Divers at the 2016 Summer Olympics
Medallists at the 2014 Commonwealth Games